Sonja Boehmer-Christiansen (born 1942) is an Emeritus Reader in the Department of Geography at the University of Hull in Kingston upon Hull England, where she taught environmental policy, management and politics. She was editor of the journal Energy & Environment from 1998 to 2017.

Early life and education
Sonja Boehmer-Christiansen was born in Dresden, East Germany. In 1956, she moved to Adelaide, South Australia, where she obtained a BA with Honours in Geomorphology from Adelaide University while also studying climatology, geology, physical geography and German literature. She moved again to England in 1969 and later attended the University of Sussex where she first obtained an MA followed by a DPhil in International Relations in 1981. Her doctoral thesis was titled, Limits to the international control of marine pollution.

Career
Boehmer-Christiansen joined the Science and Technology Policy Research Unit (SPRU) at the University of Sussex in 1985, working for a decade as a Research Fellow and then later as a visiting fellow. Since the mid-1990s she had taught environmental policy, management and politics in the Geography Department at the University of Hull. As an Emeritus Reader she still works from the University of Hull's Geography Department.

She is a past member of the United Nations Environment Programme (UNEP) Stakeholder Forum for a Sustainable Future.

Views on climate change
When asked about the publication in the Spring of 2003 of a revised version of the paper at the center of the Soon and Baliunas controversy, Boehmer-Christiansen said, "I'm following my political agenda -- a bit, anyway. But isn't that the right of the editor?"

Boehmer-Christiansen has been a critic of climate models saying they are based on data that cannot be verified. 
In 2006, she signed an open letter to Canadian Prime Minister Stephen Harper urging him to open the Kyoto Protocol to debate by holding balanced, comprehensive public-consultation sessions on the Canadian government's climate change plans.

She describes herself as agnostic on whether humans are causing global warming, and believes its negative aspects to be politically exaggerated.

Third-party views
According to Fred Pearce, Boehmer-Christiansen is a sceptic about acid rain and global warming and calls the science reports produced by the Intergovernmental Panel on Climate Change "political constructs."

The Guardian reported that Boehmer-Christiansen published – against the recommendations of a reviewer – a paper in Energy & Environment claiming that the Sun is made of iron.

Selected publications
Books
 
 
 

Journal articles

See also
Marine pollution

References

External links
 What inspired you? – Dr Sonja A Boehmer-Christiansen
 Key challenges for the next generation – Dr Sonja A Boehmer-Christiansen

1942 births
Living people
Alumni of the University of Sussex
Academics of the University of Hull
British geographers
German emigrants to Australia
Academic journal editors
Australian expatriates in the United Kingdom